Private City is a solo album by English saxophonist John Surman, released on the ECM label in 1987.

Reception
Allmusic awarded the album with 4 stars and its review by Michael G. Nastos states: "This album, a fully realized project, has Surman exploiting all of the timbres and tones available to him in a manner he could not accomplish with other musicians in real time. It's a full exploration of his soul, from land, sea, and outer atmospheric galaxies, on wings of supersonic fancy and fantasy."

Track listing
All compositions by John Surman.

"Portrait of a Romantic" – 7:03
"On Hubbard's Hill" – 4:33
"Not Love Perhaps" – 5:20
"Levitation" – 4:06
"Undernote" – 2:44
"The Wanderer" – 5:46
"Roundelay" – 5:15
"The Wizard's Song" – 8:51

Personnel
John Surman – baritone and soprano saxophones, bass clarinet, recorder, piano, synthesizer

References

1987 albums
ECM Records albums
John Surman albums
Albums produced by Manfred Eicher